Mongol Aspiration (locally abbreviated as MAIS) is a state-funded international school, offering Cambridge Secondary Education. Founded in 2011, it is the one of three International Laboratory Schools owned by the Ministry of Education, Culture and Science (Mongolia).

History 
After the Democratic Revolution of 1990, Mongolia had seen numerous educational reforms with help from international charities and organisations. Nevertheless, lack of consistency, acquaintance and investment caused a severe harm to the educational system; beginning in mid-2000s, many higher education institutions started reporting significantly lower academic performances, further demanding the government to urgently update its current education policies. Moreover, due to its absence of recognition, undergraduate applicants for foreign universities encountered various difficulties, which could have serious consequences in the country's development in the long term. Therefore, the government of Mongolia promised to undertake major educational reforms.

In 2011, the Ministry of Education announced its collaboration with the University of Cambridge to implement the new international education system. As a result of the agreement, the Ministry appointed 44 secondary schools to be laboratory schools where the new system would be tested and improved, and established 3 public international schools with Cambridge International Education.

Enrollment 
To ensure equality, Mongol Aspiration announces an enrollment examination for Grade 8 students nationwide every year. The examination includes English and Mathematics tests and the top 104 students are invited to the school. Previously, the examination was organized by Education Evaluation Centre alongside that of other 2 schools, but in 2016, the schools were given the right to organize by themselves. A delegation from Independent Authority Against Corruption of Mongolia oversees the enrolment process. Approximately 1000 students take the annual entrance examination.

Education 
Mongol Aspiration offers Cambridge International GCE, AS and A Levels from Grade 9 to Grade 12. Grade 9 students can choose one humanity, one language and one creative subjects whereas Mathematics, English (First or Second language), Physics, Chemistry, Biology are mandatory to meet the criteria for Cambridge ICE diploma. Consulting service is also provided for its students as it is an UCAS authorised centre.

Location 
During its first 5 years, Mongol Aspiration was located on 3rd floor of 115th school building. Although the government had assigned budget for a new building, due to difficulties in land availability, the construction process was delayed several times. In 2017, the school finally moved to its own building located near the National Park in Bayanzurkh District.

References
Notice: Most of the References are in Mongolian.

[in Mongolian] "Олон улсын хөтөлбөрийн сургалттай Монгол Тэмүүлэл Лаборатори Сургууль", 2016 он.

Cambridge schools in Mongolia
Schools in Mongolia